Isayevka is a rural locality (a village) in Slednevskoye Rural Settlement, Alexandrovsky District, Vladimir Oblast, Russia. The population was 9 as of 2010. There are 2 streets.

Geography 
Isayevka is located 12 km north of Alexandrov (the district's administrative centre) by road. Baksheyevo is the nearest rural locality.

References 

Rural localities in Alexandrovsky District, Vladimir Oblast